Mount Futago is a small mountain with two peaks, the northern one being  and the southern one  high, in the northern part of the Langhovde Hills, Queen Maud Land, Antarctica. It was mapped from surveys and air photos by the Japanese Antarctic Research Expedition (JARE), 1957–62. The name Futago-yama (Hutago Yama), meaning "twin mountain," was given by JARE Headquarters in 1972.

References

Mountains of Queen Maud Land
Prince Harald Coast